Peter Mansfield (born Ranchi, India, 2 September 1928; died Warwick, England, 9 March 1996) was a British political journalist. He was educated at Winchester College and Pembroke College, Cambridge, where he was elected President of the Cambridge Union.

He resigned from the British Foreign Service over the Suez affair in 1956. He worked in Beirut, editing the Middle East Forum and wrote regularly for the Financial Times, The Economist, The Guardian, the Indian Express and other newspapers. From 1961 to 1967 he was the Middle East correspondent of the Sunday Times.

His books as author or editor include Colonialism and Revolution in the Middle EastThe Middle East: A Political and Economic Survey, Habib Bourguiba of Tunisia Who's Who of the Arab World, Nasser's Egypt, Nasser: A Biography, The British in Egypt, Kuwait: Vanguard of the Gulf and The Arabs, and A History of the Middle East.

His History of the Middle East was updated after his death by Nicolas Pelham in 2013 into a fourth edition  A subsequent fifth addition was published in 2019. 

Mansfield's obituary in The Times praised him as "eloquent, scholarly, free from convention...[He] earned himself a distinguished place by forty years of thoughtful work and the passion of his convictions."

Works

References

1928 births
1996 deaths
Alumni of Pembroke College, Cambridge
British male journalists
Presidents of the Cambridge Union